The FIBT World Championships 1931 took place in Oberhof, Germany (Two-man) and in St. Moritz, Switzerland (Four-man). Two-man bobsleigh made its debut.

Two man bobsleigh

Four man bobsleigh

Medal table

References
2-Man bobsleigh World Champions
4-Man bobsleigh World Champions

1931
1931 in German sport
Sport in St. Moritz
1931 in bobsleigh
Sport in Oberhof, Germany
International sports competitions hosted by Germany
Bobsleigh in Germany